The NCAA Division II Women's Gymnastics Championships were the annual collegiate gymnastics championships for women organised by the National Collegiate Athletic Association (NCAA) for athletes competing at universities in Division II. The championship was founded in 1982, breaking away from the championship for Division I, but ceased after the 1986 championship when it was merged back into one single national championship again after just five years.

Athlete's individual performances in the various events earned points for their institution and the team with the most points received the NCAA team title. Individual championships were also awarded in certain events. The most successful team, with two national titles, were the Jacksonville State Gamecocks.

Results

See also
NCAA Women's Gymnastics Championships
NCAA Men's Gymnastics Championships
NCAA Division II Men's Gymnastics Championships
NAIA Women's Gymnastics Championships
Pre-NCAA Gymnastics Champions
List of gymnastics terms

References

External links
NCAA women's gymnastics webpage

II
Recurring sporting events established in 1982